Gheorghe Liliac  (born 22 April 1959) is a Romanian former footballer who played as a goalkeeper. His clubs included FC Bihor Oradea, Steaua București, Petrolul Ploieşti and Hapoel Tzafririm Holon F.C.

He was a member of the Romania national team that took part in the 1990 FIFA World Cup.

International career

International stats

Honours

Club
Steaua București
Divizia A: 1987–88, 1988–89
Cupa României: 1988–89

Metalul Filipeşti
Divizia D - Prahova County: 1995–96

References

External links

1959 births
Living people
People from Dorohoi
Romanian footballers
Romania international footballers
FC Bihor Oradea players
FC Petrolul Ploiești players
FC Steaua București players
1990 FIFA World Cup players
Hapoel Tzafririm Holon F.C. players
Expatriate footballers in Israel
Romanian expatriate sportspeople in Israel
Association football goalkeepers